The position of Laudian Professor of Arabic, now known as the Abdulaziz Saud AlBabtain Laudian Professor, at the University of Oxford was established in 1636 by William Laud, who at the time was Chancellor of the University of Oxford and Archbishop of Canterbury. The first professor was Edward Pococke, who was working as a chaplain in Aleppo in what is now Syria when Laud asked him to return to Oxford to take up the position. Laud's regulations for the professorship required lectures on Arabic grammar and literature to be delivered weekly during university vacations and Lent. He also provided that the professor's lectures were to be attended by all medical students and Bachelors of Arts at the university, although this seems not to have happened since Pococke had few students, despite the provision for non-attenders to be fined. In 1881, a university statute repealed Laud's regulations and provided that the professor was to lecture in "the Arabic, Syriac, and Chaldee Languages", and attached the professorship to a fellowship at St John's College.

The standard of the professors has varied. The second professor, Thomas Hyde, is described by the Oxford Dictionary of National Biography as a "mediocre orientalist", and one history of the university says of the third professor, John Wallis, that "not only did [he] give no lectures for most of his long tenure, but he did nothing to advance knowledge either." Pococke, Joseph White, Sir Hamilton Gibb, and Alfred Beeston have received high praise for their scholarship.
David Margoliouth (professor 1889–1937) taught the syllabus for the final examinations in lectures over two years, forcing some students to tackle the more difficult texts in their first year of study. Successive professors had few students until after the Second World War, when numbers increased because of the reputation of the then professor, Gibb, and because some British students became interested in Arabic culture while serving in the Middle East during the war. Julia Bray, the Laudian Professor , was appointed in 2012 and is the first woman to hold the position. She is a member of Oxford's Faculty of Oriental Studies, based at the Oriental Institute.

History

Foundation
The position of Laudian Professor of Arabic at the University of Oxford was established in 1636 by William Laud (Chancellor of the University of Oxford from 1630 to 1641 and Archbishop of Canterbury from 1633 to 1645). Laud wrote to Edward Pococke, who was serving as chaplain in Aleppo in the Aleppo Eyalet of the Ottoman Empire (now in modern-day Syria) to improve his knowledge of Arabic language and literature, requesting his return to Oxford to become the first Laudian Professor. Pococke returned in 1636 and gave his inaugural lecture on 10 August of that year. Laud also bought Arabic books for the Bodleian Library, with Pococke's assistance. Laud endowed the chair with revenues from lands in the parish of Bray, Berkshire. When he made the endowment perpetual in 1640, the university sent him a letter of thanks, saying that he had "greatly enriched" the library "by importing Araby into Oxford", had "unlocked the learning of Barbary" (i.e. the Barbary Coast of north Africa) by provision of the professorship, and had shown "untiring munificence" in endowing the chair. Laud reserved to himself the right to appoint subsequent professors during his lifetime, and afterwards provided for professors to be appointed by the President of St John's College, Oxford, the Warden of All Souls College, Oxford and the Warden of New College, Oxford (or a majority of them). He never exercised this right, as he died in 1645 while Pococke survived until 1691.

University statutes for the professorship

University regulations introduced by Laud prescribed that the professor was to lecture for one hour every Wednesday between university terms at 9am (and during Lent at 8am) on Arabic grammar and literature, using "the work of some approved and ancient author, in which the proprities of the language and the elegance of the expression are remarkable." Failure to deliver a lecture on an appointed day would be marked with a fine of 20 shillings, unless the professor was very ill or had an urgent reason for absence approved by the vice-chancellor. Laud required the lecturer to speak without using "a hurried enunciation, but make all his statements in such a way that they may be readily taken down in writing by his hearers", and to remain after the lecture to listen to any questions "with kindness, and solve the difficulties and doubts mooted." Although all Bachelors of Arts and all medical students at the university were required to attend, this does not seem to have happened: Pococke only had a few students in the years that he was in Oxford. Laud's statutes provided that a student failing to attend the lecture without gaining the approval of the vice-chancellor would be fined sixpence. Fines were to be used to purchase Arabic books for the Bodleian Library.

After reforms of the university during the second half of the 19th century, a university statute of 1881 set out the professor's duties and entitlements, and who should form the board appointing a new professor. It stated that "The Laudian Professor of Arabic shall lecture and give instruction on the Arabic, Syriac, and Chaldee Languages." The professor was to be appointed by a board consisting of the Secretary of State for India, the President of St John's College, Oxford, the Regius Professor of Hebrew, the Boden Professor of Sanskrit and Bodley's Librarian.  The chair was attached to a fellowship at St John's College, which would contribute £450 towards the professor's income. Sir Hamilton Gibb was the first Laudian Professor to be a fellow of St John's; although David Margoliouth, his predecessor, was appointed after the statute came into force, he stayed at New College where he was already a fellow.  Before the 1881 statute, the professor remained at the college (if any) with which he had links before his appointment.

Changes to the university's internal legislation in the 20th and early 21st centuries abolished specific statutes for the duties of, and rules for appointment to, individual chairs such as the Laudian professorship. The University Council is now empowered to make appropriate arrangements for appointments and conditions of service, and the college to which any professorship is allocated (St John's in the case of the Laudian chair) has two representatives on the board of electors.

Re-endowment
In 2016, the university received a large donation from Abdulaziz Saud Al Babtain to secure the chair. As such, the chair was re-named the Abdulaziz Saud AlBabtain Laudian Professorship in Arabic in recognition of its latest benefactor and its original one.

Professors
The professorship was suspended for two years after the death of Robert Gandell in 1887. The electoral board had met to select a successor, but were unable to make a suitable appointment, and so obtained the permission of the university authorities to adjourn. When the board resumed in 1889, one of the previous applicants, David Margoliouth, re-applied for the position and was successful, even though none of the people recommending him made any mention of whether he knew any Arabic. As professor, Margoliouth taught the syllabus for the final examinations in lectures over two years, regardless of the stage that students had reached, and regarded it as bad luck if a student had to tackle the more difficult texts in one year and the easier texts in the next.

Between 1916—when the university introduced a Doctorate of Philosophy for research—and 1939, there were few post-graduate students, and only one or two undergraduates took Arabic in final examinations each year. The subject grew in popularity after the Second World War: Gibb had an international reputation that attracted foreign students, while others from the United Kingdom who had spent time in the Middle East during the war were interested in studying Arabic language and culture. Julia Bray, the current holder , was appointed in 2012. She is the 15th Laudian Professor, and the first woman to hold the position. She is a member of the Faculty of Oriental Studies, based at the Oriental Institute, and is one of about 25 faculty members in the Islamic World Subject Group.

List of professors

See also
List of professorships at the University of Oxford
Lord Almoner's Professor of Arabic

Notes

References

Arabic, Laudian
Arabic, Laudian
1636 establishments in England
Lists of people associated with the University of Oxford
St John's College, Oxford
Arabists